Karim Lamido is a Local Government Area in Taraba State, Nigeria.

It has an area of 6,620 km and a population of 195,844 at the 2006 census.

The southern border of Karim Lamido is the Benue River and it is traversed by several tributaries of that river.

The postal code of the area is 662.

Karim Lamido has various ethnic groups, including Karimjo, Wurkun, Jenjo, Bambuka, Munga, kodei, Dadiya, Bandawa and fulani.
It contains about 11 political wards, some of which are Karim 'A', Karim 'A', Jen Ardido, Jen Kaigama, Muri A, Muri B, Muri C, etc.

See also
Materum, Nigeria
Muri, Nigeria
Karimjo, Nigeria

References 

Local Government Areas in Taraba State